Pinehurst School is a private education institute located in Auckland, New Zealand with a roll of approximately 1100 students. The institute was established on 3 March 1991, The school is relatively new compared to the other private schools in the region of Albany, though has matured greatly over the past 30 years. 2021 was the 30th anniversary of the school.

The school is well known for its students' success in IGCSE examination syndicate and was granted the University of Cambridge fellowship in 2007 for their outstanding results in these examinations.

Also in the year 2007, the leader of the National party John Key opened the new arts and drama facility.

In 2015 the school proposed a new college block and a new multi-sports area to replace existing tennis courts. A new library block was completed in November 2019, and was official opened on 10 February 2020, by Erica Stanford, MP of East Coast Bays. A new block named College 5 is planned to replace the village area. It is planned to contain a music theatre, seating 250, and new classrooms.

References

Primary schools in Auckland
Secondary schools in Auckland
Cambridge schools in New Zealand
North Shore, New Zealand
Educational institutions established in 1991
1991 establishments in New Zealand